Abram Lake is a lake located adjacent to Sioux Lookout in the Kenora District of Northwestern Ontario, Canada. It is at the mouth of the Marchington River and the confluence point of the Marchington River with the English River.

The English River flows from Minnitaki Lake over the Abram Rapids into Abram Lake on the south-east side, and exits over the Frog Rapids into Pelican Lake at Frog Rapids Narrows on the north-west side. The Marchington River enters at the north-east point of the lake.

See also
List of lakes in Ontario

References
Atlas of Canada topographic map sheets 52J4 and 52K1 accessed 2007-11-09
The Official Road Map of Ontario on-line section 13 accessed 2007-11-09

Lakes of Kenora District